The New Morning are a rock band formed in  Rochester, Minnesota in 2016. Formerly knows as “The Last Minute Band”, the band originally formed to play a benefit concert for Relay For Life held at Rochester Community and Technical College. Over the past 2 years the band has played shows across multiple US states and plans to tour the United Kingdom and Europe extensively in 2020. Currently the band performs at a variety of venues in and around their founding city of Rochester.

Two of the founding members, lead vocalist and guitarist Cassandra Grace and guitarist Dylan McGreevy, met while sharing music online via Facebook and YouTube. McGreevy & Grace have led the group throughout various incarnations of the band, including while McGreevy was still residing in Newcastle upon Tyne, England.

The band has described their influences and creative force as multifaceted due to the unique style and musical upbringing of each member. Their influences include Thin Lizzy, Gary Moore, Rory Gallagher, AC/DC, Johnny Cash, Bob Dylan, Neil Young, Bruce Springsteen and Steve Earle to name just a few.

History

Early years (The Last Minute Band) 
In July 2016, Israelson had booked a benefit concert for his band at the time The Rares, but had subsequently exited the band before the performance. In the last minute attempt to fulfill his commitment Israelson put together a new group. Guitarist Issac Gullickson was brought in from Addisons time at The Rares. Vocalist and guitarist Cassandra Grace and husband, guitarist Dylan McGreevy were added to the band to fill out the sound. Originally McGreevy was tasked with Bass only venturing to guitar for the occasional song. Finally, the "Man at the back" Mark Schnaedter helped round out the sound by adding percussion with his signature style of drumming.

The band's name originally came from their last-minute formation, which they later changed to The New Morning after the original "The Last Minute" tour. In the summer of 2016, the band played various dates throughout the Midwestern United States. In late August of that year, the band members went their separate ways. Schnaedter remained in Rochester, but Grace, Israelson, and Gullickson returned to their separate universities hours away from each other. Meanwhile, McGreevy returned home to Newcastle upon Tyne, England. By the end of the year, The New Morning was in hiatus until spring 2017.

"The New Morning" (2017–Present) 

In mid 2017, the band re-branded as The New Morning and currently tours with a new lineup. Founding members Grace and McGreevy now front the band mainly as a duo, but with the occasional guest appearance from Gullickson and Israelson. The band's next steps are to continue to pack their touring calendar with dates, record new material and ultimately return to a 4-5 piece band.

Band members

Current members 

 Dylan McGreevy – guitar, backing vocals (2016–present)
 Cassandra Grace – vocals, guitar (2016–present)

Current member biographies

Dylan McGreevy 
Singer-songwriter and guitarist Dylan McGreevy was raised in Newcastle upon Tyne, England. His music and lyrics have been influenced by artists such as: Thin Lizzy, Gary Moore, Rory Gallagher, AC/DC, Johnny Cash, Bob Dylan, Bruce Springsteen and Steve Earle. He returned to the states in September 2017.

Cassandra Grace 
Cassandra Grace is a talented vocalist, songwriter, and multi-instrumentalist. Cassandra loves to train horses and riders alike. She broke and trained her horse herself, along with a few other horses. Cassandra Grace graduated in 2017 with a degree in Equine Science from the University of Wisconsin River Falls.

Past member biographies

Addison Israelson 
Addison Israelson, singer, songwriter, and multi-instrumentalist, formed the band when one was needed for a benefit show at the last minute.

Isaac Gullickson 
Isaac Gullickson played lead guitar.

References

External links 

 Official website tour news
 The Official The New Morning website

Musical groups established in 2016
Musical groups from Minnesota
2016 establishments in Minnesota